Saint-Céols is a commune in the Cher department in the Centre-Val de Loire region of France.

Geography

Population

Sights
 The church of St. Céols, dating from the thirteenth century.
The sixteenth-century chateau, with two dovecotes.

See also
Communes of the Cher department

References

Communes of Cher (department)